List of films produced in the Cinema of Poland in the 1950s.

External links
Polish film at the Internet Movie Database

1950